The 2014–15 Primera Divisió was the 20th season of top-tier football in Andorra. It began on 21 September 2014, and ended in May 2015. The defending champions were FC Santa Coloma, who won their eighth championship in the previous season. FC Santa Coloma won the league again this season.

Teams

Clubs and locations

Personnel and sponsorship

Competition format
The participating teams first played a conventional round-robin schedule with every team playing each opponent once "home" and once "away" for a total of 14 games. The league was then split up in two groups of four teams with each of them playing teams within its group in a home-and-away cycle of games. The top four teams competed for the championship. The bottom four clubs played for one direct relegation spot and one relegation play-off spot. Records earned in the First Round were taken over to the respective Second Round.

Promotion and relegation from 2013–14
CE Principat were relegated after last season due to finishing in eighth place. They were replaced by Segona Divisió champions UE Engordany.

Inter Club d'Escaldes, who finished last season in 7th place, and Segona Divisió runners up CE Jenlai played a two-legged relegation play-off. Inter Club d'Escaldes won the playoff, 6–1 on aggregate, and remained in the Primera Divisió while CE Jenlai remained in the Segona Divisió.

First round

Second round
Records earned in the First Round were taken over to the respective Second Round.

Championship round
{{#invoke:Sports table|main|style=WDL
|update=complete
|source=faf.ad

|team1=FCS |team2=FCL |team3=USC |team4=USJ

|win_FCS=13 |draw_FCS=3 |loss_FCS=4 |gf_FCS=64 |ga_FCS=14 |status_FCS=C
|win_FCL=12 |draw_FCL=3 |loss_FCL=5 |gf_FCL=53 |ga_FCL=26
|win_USC=12 |draw_USC=2 |loss_USC=6 |gf_USC=33 |ga_USC=17
|win_USJ= 9 |draw_USJ=5 |loss_USJ=6 |gf_USJ=41 |ga_USJ=23
|result1=CLG |result2=EUR |result4=ELC

|name_FCS=FC Santa Coloma
|name_FCL=FC Lusitanos
|name_USC=UE Santa Coloma
|name_USJ=UE Sant Julià

|hth_FCL=FC Lusitanos were deducted 1 point due illegal lineup in match against UE Santa Coloma, compensated with 2 points.<ref name="auto">{{Cite web|url=https://www.bondia.ad/esports/apellacio-dona-la-rao-lue-santa-coloma-en-laffaire-edu-moya|title=Apel·lació dóna la raó a l'UE Santa Coloma en laffaire' Edu Moya|website=BonDia Diari digital d'Andorra.}}</ref>
|hth_USC=FCL
|class_rules=1) points; 2) head-to-head points; 3) head-to-head goal difference; 4) head-to-head goals scored; 5) goal difference; 6) goals scored
|res_col_header=Q
|col_CLG=green1 |text_CLG=Qualification to Champions League first qualifying round
|col_EUR=blue1 |text_EUR=Qualification to Europa League first qualifying round
|col_ELC=blue1 |text_ELC=Qualification to Europa League first qualifying round

|note_res_ELC=UE Sant Julià qualified for the Europa League first qualifying round by winning the 2015 Copa Constitució.
}}

Relegation round

Primera Divisió play-off
The seventh-placed/3rd-placed club (UE Engordany) from the relegation round competed in a two-legged relegation play-off against the runner-up of the 2014–15 Segona Divisió (Atlètic Club d'Escaldes), for one spot in 2015-16 Primera Divisió.UE Engordany won 4–2 on aggregate and will compete in the 2015–16 Primera DivisióTop scorersAs of 15 February 2015''

References

External links
  
Visualització de Partits - Andorran football league tables, records & statistics database. 

Primera Divisió seasons
Andorra
1